Don Antonio Tocco (16 August 1618 – 5 March 1678) was the last titular Despot of Epirus and Count Palatine of Cephalonia and Zakynthos, claiming these titles from the death of his father Leonardo V Tocco in 1641 until he abandoned them in 1642, substituting them for the title of Prince of Achaea, which he used until his death in 1678.

Antonio's change in titulature owed to his descent from Centurione II Zaccaria, the last Prince of Achaea, who had reigned more than two centuries before Antonio assumed the title. The change in titulature was respected by his contemporaries, and confirmed through a diploma by Philip IV of Spain on 4 November 1642. Antonio also worked to increase his family's standing in the Italian nobility, acquiring various fiefs in Italy through purchasing them and through his marriage to his relative, Donna Porzia di Tocco, which ensured that he inherited various fiefs from his father-in-law, Carlo di Tocco, including the town of Montemiletto. From Antonio's time onwards, the Tocco family mainly identified themselves through their ownership of Montemiletto, titling themselves as 'Princes of Montemiletto'.

Biography 
Antonio Tocco was the third son of Leonardo V Tocco, titular Despot of Epirus and Count Palatine of Cephalonia and Zakynthos, and the eldest to reach adulthood, thus being the heir to his father's titular claims to lands in Greece, and to the fiefs his family had acquired in Italy since the loss of their Greek lands; Refrancore, Apice and Tinchiano. Antonio was born in Naples on 16 August 1618. His mother was Francesca Pignatelli, daughter of the Neapolitan patrician Cesare Pignatelli.

Antonio was confirmed as heir through a decree on 6 February 1641.

On 4 November 1642, Antonio was confirmed through a diploma as the titular Prince of Achaea by Philip IV of Spain. The assumption of the title of Prince of Achaea was also a substitution of Antonio's previous Greek titles, with Antonio and his descendants ceasing to use the titles of Despot of Epirus and Count Palatine of Cephalonia and Zakynthos. Although there had not been a Prince of Achaea for more than two centuries, Antonio did have a legitimate claim to the title. The Tocco family were heirs of Thomas Palaiologos (1409–1465) in the female line. Thomas had married the heiress of Centurione II Zaccaria, the last Prince of Achaea, and had inherited the territories of the principality upon Centurione's death in 1432. The last fully documented and certain male-line descendants of Thomas Palaiologos died off in the early 16th century and the Tocco family were descended from Thomas's eldest daughter, Helena Palaiologina. 

In 1630, Antonio married his relative, Donna Porzia di Tocco, at Naples. When Antonio's father-in-law, Carlo de Tocco, a grandson of Leonardo IV Tocco, died in 1674, Antonio inherited his titles, further engraining the senior line of the Tocco family into the Italian nobility. From 1674 onwards, Antonio added 'Prince of Montemiletto, Count of Monteaperti and Baron of Grumo, Montefalcione, Serra and Manocalzati' to his titles. From Antonio's time and onwards, the Tocco family mainly identified themselves through their ownership of Montemiletto. Antonio had added to the family lands before this point as well, having purchased the barony of Calabritto in 1665 from Girolamo d’Aquino, the Prince of Pietrelcina.

Antonio died in Naples on 5 March 1678.

Family 
With his wife Donna Porzia di Tocco, Antonio had three children:

 Francesca Tocco (3 October 1637 – ?), daughter who died in infancy.
 Leonardo VI Tocco (? – 26 September 1670), the eldest son. Antonio and Leonardo appear to have quarrelled, as Antonio disinherited him from most of his titles in 1658 and 1666. In any event, Leonardo predeceased Antonio. Upon Antonio's death in 1678, his titles were inherited by Leonardo's son, Carlo Antonio Tocco.
 Carlo Tocco (? – 25 April 1710), son who became known under the titles Prince of Sant'Arcangelo and Duke of Sicignano, titles that had not existed previously.

Notes

References

Bibliography 

 

1618 births
1678 deaths
Tocco family
17th-century despots of Epirus
Counts palatine of Cephalonia and Zakynthos
Princes of Achaea
Lords of Italy